Paraentelodon is an extinct entelodont from the Late Oligocene and Oligocene-Miocene boundary of Asia. The fossils of the type species P. intermedium were found in Georgia, Kazakhstan and China. An indeterminate species represents in Bugti Hills which is  the late Oligocene of Pakistan.

Discovery and naming 
Paraentelodon was named by L. K. Gabunia in 1964 basing on molars and canine teeth that were found in Oligocene sites of Benara, Georgia (Georgian SSR at the time of discovery). It was assigned to Entelodontidae by Carroll (1988).

In 1996 Lucas and Emry found Neoentelodon to be synonymous with Paraentelodon.

Although Gabunia did not explain the etymology, the name Paraentelodon is derived from the Greek para/παρα "beside" or "near", ἐντελής entelēs "complete" or "perfect" and ὀδών odōn "tooth".

Description and relationship 
One of the largest entelodonts, it had much more massive teeth than those of Entelodon. The close relative of P. intermedium is probably "Elodon transsilvanicus" (Kretzoi, 1941) from Oligocene of Romania because of the similarities of knolls on their molars. In spite of this, Paraentelodon had more common features with Asian and North American entelodonts. It was similar in size and form to the giant entelodont, Daeodon, of early Miocene of North America. The structure of their hands is visibly similar, but Paraentelodon has larger premolars, less reduction of posterior group of third knoll, a smaller collar of cheek teeth, etc. Some researchers suggest that it was either ancestral to, or shared an ancestor with Daeodon during a late Oligocene Beringian immigration. As with other entelodonts, it was an omnivore that had large teeth that enabled it to crush bone and dig for tubers like its North American relatives.

Paleoenvironment 
In the late Oligocene horizon of Balochistan, Paraentelodon sp. was found in the same crust as the giant rhinocerotoid Paraceratherium bugtiense and the anthracothere Anthracotherium bugtiense. The fauna of this locality also includes the bovid−like ruminant Palaeohypsodontus zinensis. All these animals attests to life of an open forested territory.

The jaws of Paraentelodon were found in the early Miocene Jiaozigou locality of China where a tusk of a Gomphotherium-like proboscidean was also present.

References

Entelodonts
Oligocene even-toed ungulates
Oligocene mammals of Asia
Fossil taxa described in 1964
Prehistoric even-toed ungulate genera